J. C. Hall may refer to:

 J. C. Hall (author), Chinese-Canadian writer
 J. C. Hall (businessman), American businessman and founder of Hallmark
 J. C. Hall (poet), British poet